Hægeland or Hægelandskrossen is a village in Vennesla municipality in Agder county, Norway. The village is located along the northeastern shore of the lake Hægelandsvatnet, a short distance south of the Kilefjorden. The Norwegian National Road 9 runs north-south through the village, just past Hægeland Church.

The village was the administrative centre of the old Hægeland Municipality which existed from 1896 until 1964 when the municipality was merged into Vennesla.

Name
The village (originally the parish) is named after the old Hægeland farm (Old Norse: Helgaland) since that is where the Hægeland Church was located. The first element of the name means "holy" (Old Norse: heilagr and ) and the last element (Old Norse: land) is identical with the word land which means "land". This area was important to ancient Norse pagan worship.

References

External links
Weather information for Hægeland 

Vennesla
Villages in Agder